Kummil  is a village in Kollam district in the state of Kerala, India

Educational organizations

 GHSS KUMMIL

Tourist attractions 
 Meenmutty Falls
.

Demographics
 India census, Kummil had a population of 19978 with 9423 males and 10555 females. 
.

References

Villages in Kollam district